Darvi (also Dariv) is a sum (district) of Govi-Altai Province in western Mongolia. In 2009, its population was 1,819.

References

Populated places in Mongolia
Districts of Govi-Altai Province